Teenage Mutant Ninja Turtles II can refer to:

Teenage Mutant Ninja Turtles II: The Secret of the Ooze, the second original TMNT film
Teenage Mutant Ninja Turtles (arcade game), later released as Teenage Mutant Ninja Turtles II: The Arcade Game on the NES
Teenage Mutant Ninja Turtles II: Back from the Sewers, a 1991 Game Boy video game
Teenage Mutant Ninja Turtles 2: Battle Nexus, a 2004 video game
Teenage Mutant Ninja Turtles: Out of the Shadows, a 2016 film and sequel to the 2014 reboot

See also
 Teenage Mutant Ninja Turtles (disambiguation)

sv:Teenage Mutant Ninja Turtles II